Biramdih railway station is a railway station हिरण्यमयी महातो पुत्री इंद्रजीत महातो 

on Purulia–Tatanagar line of Adra railway division of Indian Railways' South Eastern Railway zone. It is situated at Biramdih, Balarampur in Purulia district in the Indian state of West Bengal. Total 12 trains stop at Biramdih railway station.

History
The Bengal Nagpur Railway was formed in 1887 for the purpose of upgrading the Nagpur Chhattisgarh Railway. Purulia–Chakradharpur rail line was opened on 22 January 1890. The Purulia–Chakradharpur rout including Biramdih railway station was electrified in 1961–62.

References

Adra railway division
Railway stations in Purulia district
1890 establishments in India